Bounce at the Devil (or volume 5 Johnny Defeats Satan) is the fourth studio album by Dublin band Republic of Loose. It was released on October 8, 2010, on Fish don't fear nets records. It was recorded at Wrightway Studios in Baltimore, Maryland, and the additional recordings were done at Mule Studios, Dublin. The album received critical acclaim. They also received an IMRO award for Bounce at the Devil going to number 1 in the Irish Independent Chart, the album also peaked at number 10 in the Irish music charts. Bo Starks made an appearance on the song "99". "The Man", "99" and "The Blah Bounce" were released as singles.

Track listing 
 1. The Lamp
 2.I Love the Police
 3.How is Your Brain?
 4.Is This Not What You Wanted?
 5.Ded Prostitutes
 6.My Heroez
 7. The Blah Bounce
 8.Satan Bounce (Waltz with Satan and the Mechanical Prostitute)
 9.She's So Evil
 10.Mezmefried
 11. Golf With Satan
 12.99 (Feat. Bo Starks)
 13. The Man
 14.Deludable
 15. What Kinda Man Would I Be?

References

2010 albums
Republic of Loose albums